Aimone Duce (also called Aimo Dux and Aymo Dux) was an Italian painter for the court of Savoy-Acaia, documented as active during 1417 and 1444. He is known for some frescoes painted in the churches of the Pinerolese: and the chapel of Missione at Villafranca Piemonte and the chapel of Santa Maria della Stella at Macello.

References
 Excerpt translated from Italian Wikipedia.

Bibliography
 Di Macco M., 1979, scheda Dux Aymo, 1429 in Castelnuovo E., Romano G., Giacomo Jaquerio e il gotico internazionale, (catalogo mostra), Palazzo Madama
 
 N. Garavelli, 'Dux Aymo' (1417-1444): ultime ricerche sui documenti d'archivio, in: "Bollettino della Società Piemontese di archeologia e Belle Arti", 1 (2000), p. 77-88.
 Ferrero F. G.,  Formica E., 2002, Arte medievale nel Canavese, Ivrea, Priuli & Verlucca Editori
 Baiocco S., Castronovo S., Pagella E., 2003, Arte in Piemonte - Il Gotico, Ivrea, Priuli & Verlucca Editori
 C. Bertolotto, N. Garavelli, B. Oderzo Gabrieli, "Magister Dux Aymo pictor de Papie". Un pittore pavese in Piemonte (notizie 1417–1444), in "Arte Lombarda", n. 163 (3), 2011, pp. 5–45. 
 Ernst Gombrich, Dizionario della Pittura e dei Pittori, Einaudi Editore,  1997 
 Arabella Cifani, Franco Monetti, Carlotta Venegoni, Marco Piccat, con la collaborazione di Augusto Cantamessa, La cappella di Santa Maria di Missione di Villafranca Piemonte. Un capolavoro del gotico internazionale italiano, Torino, Umberto Allemandi ed., 2014

15th-century Italian painters
Italian male painters
Gothic painters
Painters from Piedmont